The Naval Battle of Casablanca was a series of naval engagements fought between American ships covering the invasion of North Africa and Vichy French ships defending the neutrality of French Morocco in accordance with the Second Armistice at Compiègne during World War II. The last stages of the battle consisted of operations by German U-boats which had reached the area the same day the French troops surrendered.

Allied military planners anticipated an all-American force assigned to seize the Atlantic port city of Casablanca might be greeted as liberators. An invasion task force of 102 American ships carrying 35,000 American soldiers approached the Moroccan coast undetected under cover of darkness. French defenders interpreted the first contacts as a diversionary raid for a major landing in Algeria; and Germany regarded the surrender of six Moroccan divisions to a small commando raiding force as a clear violation of French obligations to defend Moroccan neutrality under the Armistice of 22 June 1940 at Compiègne. An escalating series of surprised responses in an atmosphere of mistrust and secrecy caused the loss of four U.S. troopships and the deaths of 462 men aboard 24 French ships opposing the invasion.

Background
Morocco was a protectorate of France at the time of World War II. The French government at Vichy had surrendered to Germany after the Battle of France, signing an Armistice with Nazi Germany. General Charles de Gaulle led French forces opposed to the surrender and to the Vichy government, continuing the war on the side of the UK and the Allies. The Vichy regime—which controlled Morocco—was thus officially neutral, but in practical terms the Armistice obliged Vichy to resist any attempt to seize French territory or equipment for use against Germany. British forces had bombarded the French at Mers-el-Kébir to prevent the French fleet from falling into German hands after the French rejected demands to join the Allies or sail to a neutral port, leading to much ill-will between France and Britain. The United States government had previously recognized the Vichy regime as legitimate. Military planning for Operation Torch in 1942 emphasized American troops in the initial landing forces on the basis of intelligence estimates they would be less vigorously opposed than British soldiers.

American forces
These ships were screened by 38 American destroyers. The resulting Task Force 34 (TF 34) included 102 ships for the invasion of Morocco under the command of Rear Admiral Henry Kent Hewitt aboard the flagship heavy cruiser . As TF 34 sailed, the British submarine  landed Major General Mark W. Clark near Algiers to meet with pro-American French military officers stationed in Algeria. French officers shared information about defensive arrangements; but the Americans did not share critical invasion details of timing, strength and distribution of forces. No information was provided to key French leaders including Armed Forces Commander in Chief Admiral François Darlan, North African Commander in Chief General Alphonse Juin, or Moroccan Resident General Charles Noguès.

French forces
In 1942, Casablanca was the principal Vichy-controlled port on the Atlantic (all of France′s Atlantic coast having been occupied by Germany since 1940) and the most important Vichy-controlled naval base after Toulon. Naval gunners manned the El Hank coastal artillery battery of four  guns and four  guns.  One quadruple 380 mm/45 Modèle 1935 gun turret of the modern battleship  was operational, although the battleship remained incomplete following escape from the Saint-Nazaire shipyards during the German invasion of 1940. One light cruiser, two flotilla leaders, seven destroyers (two already damaged by collision), eight sloops, 11 minesweepers, and 11 submarines were in port on the morning of 8 November.

Most French personnel attending General Clark′s pre-invasion meeting were army officers. Information subsequently conveyed in pre-invasion contact with army personnel stationed in Morocco was interpreted as a request for recommendations. No pre-invasion contact has been documented with Vice Admiral Michelier, who commanded naval forces responsible for the defense of Casablanca. Admiral Michelier was not yet in the confidence of North African officers in contact with the Americans, since he had been a member of the Armistice Commission until assuming his Casablanca post less than a month before the invasion.

Prelude
French defenders were placed on alert status when Algerian invasion convoys were detected passing through the Strait of Gibraltar. Destinations remained unclear, and TF 34 remained undetected as it split into three groups on 7 November. Naval coastal defense batteries flanked both ends of the Fedala landing beach with four  guns on Pont Blondin  to the east and three  and two  guns in Fedala on the point sheltering the western end of the beach.

Battle

8 November

Loaded landing craft rendezvoused and left the line of departure at 06:00. Pont Blondin coast defense batteries were alerted by the noise of landing craft engines and illuminated the beach approaches with searchlights but the searchlights were extinguished when the landing craft support boats opened fire with machine guns. The destroyer  and a scout boat tasked with marking Red Beach 2 moved out of position while maneuvering to avoid an unidentified boat evaluated as potentially hostile; and landing craft ran onto rocks while running at full speed rather than reaching their intended beach. Twenty-one of the 32 landing craft from Leonard Wood were wrecked. Eight of the ship's surviving landing craft were wrecked in heavy surf landing later waves.

3,500 American troops were ashore by dawn; but early morning mist concealed the size of the invasion force. Fedala coast defense batteries opened fire on the landing craft shortly after 07:00. At 07:20, Admiral Hewitt authorized four American destroyers supporting the landing craft to open fire on the French shore batteries. Ludlow and Wilkes silenced the Pont Blondin battery, while Augusta silenced the Fedala battery. Murphy, and other U.S. vessels engaged two French aircraft just before 07:00 on 8 November, ultimately driving them off.

The French submarines Amazone,  and  sortied to defensive patrol stations at 07:00. At 07:50, French fighters rose to intercept a force of bombers from Ranger and Suwanee. The French fighters were engaged by fighters from Ranger in a dogfight that felled seven French and four or five American planes. Bombs started falling on Casablanca Harbor at 08:04. The El Hank battery observed gunfire from the covering force and straddled Massachusetts with its first salvo. The operational turret aboard the incomplete battleship  also opened fire and was targeted by Massachusetts. Jean Bart had fired only seven rounds before Massachusetts fifth salvo jammed the turret rotating mechanism on Jean Bart. Massachusetts heavy 16-inch projectiles caused significant damage although few actually exploded because they had been fitted with fuzes manufactured in 1918. The covering force then targeted El Hank Battery from 08:40 to 09:25.

While the covering force engaged El Hank Battery west of Casablanca, seven ships of the French 2nd Light Squadron sortied from Casablanca harbor at 09:00 under cover of a smoke screen to attack the troopships anchored off Fedala to the east. At 09:20, the French squadron was strafed by fighter planes from Ranger. French gunners sank a landing craft and scored hits on Ludlow. Milan beached after being damaged by gunfire from Wilkes, Wichita, and Tuscaloosa. Massachusetts and Tuscaloosa engaged the French destroyers Fougueux at 10:00 and Boulonnais at 10:12. Fougueux sank at 10:40. Engaged by Massachusetts, the Primauguet force was outgunned; Primauguet had been under refit and was not fully operational but returned fire nonetheless. The French flotilla was also engaged by Augusta and Brooklyn from 11:00 to 11:20. Albatros beached to avoid sinking. The remaining ships returned to Casablanca harbor where Primauguet beached and burnt out and the two destroyers capsized. Forty-five crew members were killed aboard Primauguet, and more than 200 more wounded. The French submarine Amazone missed Brooklyn with a salvo of torpedoes. Sibylle disappeared on a patrol station between Casablanca and Fedala, but the cause of her destruction remains uncertain. Surviving French submarines  and  sortied without torpedoes to avoid destruction in the harbor.  managed to load a few torpedoes before leaving.

A less significant victim of this engagement was the boat in which General Patton had intended to reach the beach from the flagship Augusta. The boat had been swung out on davits in preparation for launch when muzzle blast from the cruiser's 8-inch guns blew out the bottom of the boat, causing most of Patton's luggage to be lost overboard.

Three small French warships emerged from Casablanca harbor in the early afternoon to rescue sailors from the sunken destroyer Fougueux, but the rescue ships were turned back by shellfire from the American covering force. French planes bombed and strafed the landing beach at intervals throughout the day, but caused little damage. Workmen had repaired Jean Barts turret by sundown, and El Hank Battery remained operational. Nearly half of the 347 American landing craft had been destroyed, and fewer than 8,000 troops had been landed. Five French submarines still stalked the invasion fleet.

9 November
Dawn found the Fedala landing beaches lashed by  waves which greatly impeded unloading the invasion troopships. Forty percent of the troops were ashore with barely one percent of their supplies. There were shortages of ammunition, and inadequate medical supplies for the wounded. Communications broke down because radio equipment was still aboard the troopships. The advance toward Casablanca halted because shore parties lacked mechanized equipment to move supplies off the landing beach.

10 November
The French sloops Commandant Delage and La Gracieuse sortied at 10:00 to open fire on American troops advancing from Fedala to the outskirts of Casablanca. The cruiser Augusta and destroyers  and  chased the minesweepers back into Casablanca harbor before being forced to retreat by gunfire from Jean Bart. Nine dive bombers from Ranger hit Jean Bart with two  bombs and sank her at 16:00. Jean Bart settled into the harbor mud with decks awash. French submarines Le Tonnant, Meduse and Antiope launched unsuccessful torpedo salvos at Ranger, Massachusetts and Tuscaloosa, respectively. Meduse was crippled by counterattacks and beached off Cape Blanc.

11 November

Casablanca surrendered on 11 November while 11,000 tons (75 percent) of supplies for the invading troops remained aboard the troopships. That day German submarines were able to reach the troopships before they completed offloading cargo. In the early evening,  torpedoed the destroyer , the oiler  and the troopship Joseph Hewes; around 100 men went down with Joseph Hewes. At this time, Bristol spotted a surfaced submarine and engaged with her deck guns and finally with depth charges, but is not believed to have sunk the French submarine. Sidi Ferruch was sunk by Grumman TBF Avenger torpedo bombers from Suwanee on 11 November.

Final actions
The invasion troopships remained in their makeshift anchorage to keep Casablanca's harbor open to unload additional troops from the anticipated arrival of convoy UGF-2 until —under Ernst Kals—torpedoed the troopships Tasker H. Bliss, Hugh L. Scott, and Edward Rutledge on the evening of 12 November, killing 74 additional American servicemen; and prompting undamaged troopships to leave the anchorage and maneuver evasively at sea until they were able to moor in the lee of the Casablanca breakwater on 13 November to complete offloading supplies. Of the American ships damaged by submarine torpedoes on 11 and 12 November, all four troopships sank, but the oiler and destroyer were repaired. Surviving troopships left Casablanca when unloading was completed on 17 November. French submarines Amazone and Antiope reached Dakar, and Orphee returned to Casablanca after the city surrendered. Le Conquerant was sunk on 13 November by two VP-92 PBY Catalina flying boats off  Villa Cisneros. Le Tonnant was scuttled off Cadiz on 15 November. On 16 November, U-173 was sunk off Casablanca by American destroyers.

One of the Massachusetts' 16 in (406 mm) shells weighing more than a ton, fired at the Jean-Bart, after an unexpected rebound on the quay, caused the collapse, with the death of three of its inhabitants, of the house adjoining the Ettedgui Synagogue which remained intact, in Casablanca's medina. Later, the artificers trolley to remove the defused shell having given way under the overload, it was then necessary to send for a truck.

Order of battle

French 2nd Light Squadron

American covering force

See also
 List of French military equipment of World War II
 Attack on Mers-el-Kébir
 Atlantic Theater aircraft carrier operations during World War II#Allied Invasion of North Africa (1942)

Notes

Citations

References
 Atkinson, Rick, An Army at Dawn (2002) Henry Holt and Company 
 Auphan, Paul and Mordal, Jacques, The French Navy in World War II (1976) Greenwood Press 
 Blair, Clay, Hitler's U-Boat War: The Hunted 1942–1945 (1998) Random House 
 Brown, David, Warship Losses of World War II (1995) Naval Institute Press 
 Cressman, Robert J. The Official Chronology of the U.S. Navy in World War II (2000) Naval Institute Press 
 Kafka, Roger and Pepperburg, Roy L. Warships of the World (1946) Cornell Maritime Press
 Karig, Walter, CDR, USNR Battle Report: The Atlantic War (1946) Farrar & Rinehart
 Le Masson, Henri The French Navy (volume 1) (1969) Doubleday & Company
 Potter, E.B. and Nimitz, Chester W. Sea Power (1960) Prentice-Hall
 Preston, Antony Jane's Fighting Ships of World War II (1996) Random House 
 Rohwer, Jurgen and Hummelchen, Gerhard Chronology of the War at Sea 1939–1945 (1992) Naval Institute Press 
 Silverstone, Paul H. U.S. Warships of World War II (1968) Doubleday & Company
 Willoughby, Malcolm F. The U.S. Coast Guard in World War II (1957) United States Naval Institute

Conflicts in 1942
Naval battles and operations of the European theatre of World War II
Atlantic and Arctic theatres of World War II
Naval aviation operations and battles
Naval battles of World War II involving France
Naval battles of World War II involving the United States
History of Casablanca
1942 in Morocco
20th century in Casablanca
Military battles of Vichy France
Naval battles of World War II involving Germany
North African campaign
November 1942 events